17 Again is a 2009 American teen fantasy comedy film directed by Burr Steers. The film follows a 37-year-old man named Mike (Matthew Perry) who becomes his 17-year-old self (Zac Efron) after a chance accident. The film also stars Leslie Mann, Thomas Lennon, Michelle Trachtenberg, Melora Hardin and Sterling Knight in supporting roles. The film was released in the United States on April 17, 2009. It received mixed reviews from critics and grossed $139 million.

Plot
In 1989, 17-year-old star athlete Mike O'Donnell's girlfriend Scarlet Porter tells him that she is pregnant, just moments before his likely scholarship-clinching high-school championship basketball game. Mike plays the first few seconds of the game, then walks off the court and goes after Scarlet, abandoning his hopes of going to college and achieving a career that could support their future. Twenty years later, 37-year-old Mike finds his life stagnant and boring, abandoning any project he starts. Scarlet, now his wife and mother of their two children, has filed for divorce, forcing him to move in with his geeky, yet extremely wealthy, but equally unhappy best friend, Ned Gold. He has quit his job after he is passed over for a promotion he believed he deserves, and his high-school-age kids, 18-year-old Maggie and 16-year-old Alex, want nothing to do with him. Later, while driving, an encounter on a bridge with a janitor transforms Mike back into his 17-year-old self.

After convincing Ned of his identity, Ned believes that Mike's transformation was caused by a mystical spirit guide who is trying to steer him on a better path. Mike enrolls in high school posing as Mark Gold, Ned's son, and plans to go to college on a basketball scholarship. As he befriends his bullied son and discovers that his daughter has a boyfriend, Stan, who does not respect her and frequently torments Alex, Mike comes to believe that his mission is to help them.

Through their kids, Mike spends time with Scarlet, who notes his remarkable resemblance to her husband, but rationalizes it as an odd coincidence. Deciding to also try and fix his relationship with Scarlet, Mike begins to finish (under the pretense of getting "volunteer credit") all of the garden projects he abandoned as an adult. He does his best to separate Stan and Maggie while also encouraging Alex to be more confident so he can make the basketball team and go out with a girl he has a crush on named Nicole. Mike has difficulty resisting his desire for Scarlet despite the relationship's clear inappropriateness. Ned, meanwhile, begins to pursue the school's principal Jane Masterson through increasingly extravagant stunts in order to win her affections, which she adamantly rebukes, though she agrees to a date after he offers to buy laptops for the school.

On their date, Jane is completely unimpressed with Ned until he drops the "sophisticated rich-guy" persona and admits he is actually a geek. Jane then reveals her own enthusiasm for geek culture by speaking to him in Elvish, and the two hit it off. Mike throws a party to celebrate a basketball game win at Ned's house while Ned is out with Jane, where he confronts Stan, who had recently dumped Maggie for not sleeping with him. Mike gets knocked out and wakes up to Maggie trying to seduce him. Mike tells his daughter that he is in love with someone else and Maggie leaves, much to Mike's relief. Scarlet arrives at the party worried about her kids attending, but Mike shows her that Alex has finally managed to get together with his crush. The two have an intimate conversation where Mike, caught up in the moment, tries to kiss her. Disgusted, she storms off as Mike tries unsuccessfully to explain his true identity.

On the day of the court hearing to finalize Scarlet and Mike's divorce, Mike makes one last attempt to win her back (as Mark) by reading a supposed letter from Mike. He states that although he couldn't set things right in the beginning of his life, it doesn't change the fact that he still loves her. After he exits, Scarlet notices that the "letter" is actually the directions to the courtroom, and she begins to grow curious. As a result, she postpones the divorce by a month. Frustrated that he could not salvage his marriage, Mike decides to once again pursue a scholarship and move on with a new life. During a high school basketball game, Mike reveals himself to Scarlet. As Scarlet runs away, Mike decides to chase her down, just like he did in 1989, but not before handing the ball off to his son. Mike is then transformed back into his 37-year-old self, and happily reunites with Scarlet, saying that she was the best decision he ever made.

As Mike prepares for his first day as the new basketball coach at his kids' school, Ned, who has successfully started a relationship with Jane, gifts him a whistle, both happy with their new starts in life.

Cast

 Matthew Perry / Zac Efron as Mike O'Donnell / Mark Gold: Perry portrays Mike at age 37, while Efron portrays Mike at age 17 in the opening flashback from 1989 and after Mike has undergone his magical transformation into posing as Mark Gold, son of his future friend Ned.
 Leslie Mann / Allison Miller as Scarlet O'Donnell: Mike's soon-to-be former wife and the mother of his children. Mann plays Scarlet as an adult and Miller plays Scarlet as a teen in the opening flashback from 1989.
 Thomas Lennon / Tyler Steelman as Ned Gold: Mike's best friend. Lennon plays the adult Ned, while Steelman portrays Ned in the opening flashback from 1989.
 Michelle Trachtenberg as Margaret Sarah "Maggie" O'Donnell: Mike and Scarlet's 18-year-old daughter. Her conception was the reason Mike chose to abandon his dreams and marry Scarlet. She dates Stan.
 Sterling Knight as Alex O'Donnell: Mike and Scarlet's 16-year-old son. He is harshly abused by Stan.
 Melora Hardin as Principal Jane Masterson: principal of the high school that Mike, Scarlet and Ned used to attend, and Maggie, Alex and "Mark" currently attends. She is also Ned's love interest.
 Hunter Parrish as Stan: Maggie's aggressive and toxic former boyfriend who bullies Alex even in his house.
 Nicole Sullivan as Naomi (pronounced "Nay-o-me"): Scarlet's best friend
 Kat Graham, Tiya Sircar and Melissa Ordway as Jamie, Samantha and Lauren: the three girls who are friends with Maggie, and constantly trying to flirt with "Mark".
 Brian Doyle-Murray as Janitor: the magical spirit guide who makes the transformation possible.
 Josie Loren as Nicole: the head cheerleader and Alex's crush.
 Jim Gaffigan as Coach Murphy: the high school basketball coach who has been there for 20 years.
 Margaret Cho as Mrs. Dell: a teacher

Reception

Critical response
On Rotten Tomatoes the film has an approval rating of 56% based on 149 reviews, with an average rating of 5.40/10. The site's critics consensus reads, "Though it uses a well-worn formula, 17 Again has just enough Zac Efron charm to result in a harmless, pleasurable teen comedy." On Metacritic, the film has a weighted average score of 48 out of 100, based on reviews from 27 critics, indicating "mixed or average reviews". Audiences polled by CinemaScore gave the film an average grade of "A−" on an A+ to F scale.

Roger Ebert gave the film 3 stars out of 4, writing: "17 Again is pleasant, harmless PG-13 entertainment, with a plot a little more surprising and acting a little better than I expected."
Justin Chang of Variety wrote: "Zac Efron's squeaky-clean tweener-bait profile is unlikely to be threatened by 17 Again, an energetic but earthbound comic fantasy that borrows a few moves, if little inspiration, from Big and It's a Wonderful Life."

Box office
The film was projected to take in around $20 million in its opening weekend. Opening in 3,255 theaters in the United States and Canada, the film grossed $23.7 million ranking #1 at the box office, with 70% of the audience consisting of young females. By the end of its run, 17 Again grossed $64.2 million in North America and $72.1 million internationally, totaling $136.3 million worldwide.

Soundtrack
17 Again: Original Motion Picture Soundtrack was released on April 21, 2009, by New Line Records.

Track listing
 "On My Own" by Vincent Vincent and the Villains
 "Can't Say No" by The Helio Sequence
 "L.E.S. Artistes" by Santigold
 "Naïve" by The Kooks
 "This Is Love" by Toby Lightman
 "You Really Wake Up the Love in Me" by The Duke Spirit
 "The Greatest" by Cat Power
 "Rich Girls" by The Virgins
 "This Is for Real" by Motion City Soundtrack
 "Drop" by Ying Yang Twins
 "Cherish" by Kool & the Gang
 "Bust a Move" by Young MC
 "Danger Zone" by Kenny Loggins

Additional music credits
 "Kid" by The Pretenders
 "Nookie" by Limp Bizkit
 "The Underdog" by Spoon
 "High School Never Ends" by Bowling for Soup 
 "Push It Fergasonic (DJ Axel Mashup)" by Fergie, Salt-n-Pepa, JJ Fad

The orchestral score was written by Rolfe Kent and orchestrated by Tony Blondal. It was recorded at Skywalker Sound.

Adaptation
A South Korean television series titled 18 Again based on the film aired on JTBC from September 21 to November 10, 2020.

See also
 Big, 1988 comedy drama film about a boy who becomes a full-grown man
 Back to the Future, 1985 comedy film about a son who time travels to when his parents were in high school. 
 A Distant Neighborhood, a 1990s Japanese manga about an adult re-living his teenage life
 Seventeen Again, 2000 American fantasy–comedy film about two grandparents who are turned 17 years old
 13 Going on 30, 2004 American romantic comedy film about a 13 year old girl who suddenly turns 30
 Mrs. Doubtfire, 1993 American comedy film about a father who disguises himself to get closer to his estranged family
 Little, 2019 American comedy film about an evil boss who becomes a little girl

References

External links

 
 
 
 
 

2000s teen fantasy films
2000s coming-of-age comedy films
2000s fantasy comedy films
2000s high school films
2000s romantic fantasy films
2000s teen comedy films
2000s teen romance films
2009 films
2009 romantic comedy films
American coming-of-age comedy films
American fantasy comedy films
American high school films
American romantic comedy films
American romantic fantasy films
American teen comedy films
American teen romance films
Coming-of-age romance films
2000s English-language films
Films directed by Burr Steers
Films scored by Rolfe Kent
Films set in 1989
Films set in 2009
Films shot in Los Angeles
New Line Cinema films
Warner Bros. films
Films about rapid human age change
2000s American films